Limnonectes liui is a species of frog in the family Dicroglossidae. It is found in Yunnan, China, but it likely occurs also in nearby Laos and Myanmar. The taxonomic placement of this species has been much debated and varies between sources.

They can be found in or near streams in forested areas. Males guard the eggs are laid in a hole in the ground covered with leaves. The eggs develop directly into small froglets.

Limnonectes liui are threatened by habitat loss caused by agriculture and infrastructure development for tourism.

References

Liui
Amphibians described in 1983
Frogs of China
Endemic fauna of Yunnan
Taxa named by Yang Zhongjian
Taxonomy articles created by Polbot